Henry Maurice may refer to:

Henry Maurice (minister) (1634–1682), Welsh Independent clergyman
Henry Maurice (theologian) (c. 1647–1691), clergyman and Lady Margaret Professor of Divinity at Oxford University
Henry Gascoyne Maurice (1874–1950)

See also
Henry Morris (disambiguation)